Visuospatial function refers to cognitive processes necessary to "identify, integrate, and analyze space and visual form, details, structure and spatial relations" in more than one dimension.   

Visuospatial skills are needed for movement, depth and distance perception, and spatial navigation. Impaired visuospatial skills can result in, for example, poor driving ability because distances are not judged correctly or difficulty navigating in space such as bumping into things.

Visuospatial processing refers to the "ability to perceive, analyze, synthesize, manipulate and transform visual patterns and images". Visuospatial working memory (VSWM) is involved in recalling and manipulating images to remain oriented in space and keep track of the location of moving objects.

Early impairment in visuospatial function is found in dementia with Lewy bodies and other conditions.

See also 
 Sensory nervous system
 Spatial memory
 Visual agnosia
 Visual spatial attention
 Visual system

References

Cognition
Neuropsychological assessment
Neuropsychology
Visual perception